The Amphitheatrum Castrense is a Roman amphitheatre in Rome, next to the church of Santa Croce in Gerusalemme. Both the Amphiteatrum and the Circus Varianus were part of the palatial villa known as the Sessorium.  The Regionary Catalogues name it as the "Amphitheatrum Castrense", which could mean it was an amphitheatre connected to an imperial residence, which was not uncommon.

History

The amphitheatre is dated to the first decades of the 3rd century AD by the style of the bricks and the absence of brick stamps. It was part of an Imperial villa complex which was built by emperors of the Severan dynasty. The open arches of the outer walls were walled up when the building was incorporated into the Aurelian Walls (271–-275 AD), at which point it stopped being used for spectacles and began to be used as fortification, and the ground level around the building was lowered. In the middle of the 16th century the remains of the second story were demolished for defensive needs.  In the 18th century, a hypogeum was found beneath the arena, filled with the bones of large animals.  This leads researchers to believe that the spectacles here included venationes, the hunting and killing of wild animals. Andrea Palladio and Étienne Dupérac made drawings about the ruins.

Construction

The building is a regular ellipse 88 meters long and 75.80 meters wide.  It is constructed out of brick-faced concrete, with a few decorative elements in travertine. The structure was three stories high, but only a section of the lowest story is preserved.

See also
 List of Roman amphitheatres

References

External links

Information at LacusCurtius
Map at Wikimapia

Buildings and structures completed in the 3rd century
Castrense